Howard Center Township is a township in Howard County, Iowa, USA.

References

Howard County, Iowa
Townships in Iowa